Petr Kostelník (born 5 February 1964) is a retired football goalkeeper who represented the Czechoslovakia national football team, winning three caps. He played club football in Prague for Sparta and Dukla. He also played for Lázně Bohdaneč. In the Gambrinus liga, Kostelník played for teams including Sparta, Bohdaneč and Žižkov.

Kostelník suffered a non-fatal heart attack in 2006 at the age of 42, while working as assistant coach at Bohemians 1905.

References

1964 births
Living people
Czechoslovak footballers
Association football goalkeepers
Czechoslovakia under-21 international footballers
Czechoslovakia international footballers
Czech First League players
FC Zbrojovka Brno players
Dukla Prague footballers
FK Chmel Blšany players
AC Sparta Prague players
FK Viktoria Žižkov players
AFK Atlantic Lázně Bohdaneč players
Footballers from Brno